Kaivinai Pokkisham Award (Living Treasure Craftsman) is an Indian award given to the best senior artisans in the State every year

Candidates include artisans who make Panchaloha idols, bronze lamps and articles, Tanjore paintings and plates, stone carvings, Kalamkari and Battik paintings, paper mache dolls, mat weaving, bamboo and palm articles

Ten artisans above 65 years of age are selected by a panel. The Award comprises Rs one lakh, citation and certificate besides one sovereign gold medal.

References 

Tamil Nadu awards
Indian art awards
Year of establishment missing